Generation Genocide is the third album released by Jersey on April 27, 2004.

Track listing
 "This Town"
 "Generation Genocide"
 "Story of '53"
 "Shop Floor"
 "Crossfire"
 "One Way St."
 "Violation Detonation"
 "Lessons"
 "Interlude"
 "Saturday Night"
 "Richmond Resurrection"
 "Old Bones and Dirty Coffins"
 "Hourglass"
 "City Streets"

Personnel
Siegfried Meier - 	Editing, second engineer

References 

2004 albums
Jersey (band) albums